Horsetail milkweed is a common name for several plants and may refer to:

Asclepias subverticillata
Asclepias verticillata